The 1995 Boston College Eagles football team represented Boston College in the 1995 NCAA Division I-A football season. The Eagles were led by second-year head coach Dan Henning and played their home games at Alumni Stadium in Chestnut Hill, Massachusetts. Despite high preseason expectations, Boston College finished with a disappointing overall record of 4–8 (4–3 Big East), tied for 4th in the Big East Conference.

Schedule

Roster

Game summaries

Ohio State

Virginia Tech

Michigan

Michigan State

Pitt

West Virginia

Army

Notre Dame

Temple

Miami (FL)

Syracuse

Rutgers

References

Boston College
Boston College Eagles football seasons
Boston College Eagles football
Boston College Eagles football